The 1984–85 Elitserien season was the tenth season of the Elitserien, the top level of ice hockey in Sweden. 10 teams participated in the league, and Sodertalje SK won the championship.

Standings

Playoffs

External links
 Swedish Hockey League official site

Swedish Hockey League seasons
1984–85 in Swedish ice hockey
Swedish